Brittany Allen (born February 5, 1986) is a Canadian actress. Her first notable role was as Marissa Chandler on All My Children from 2009 to 2010, for which she received a Daytime Emmy Award for Outstanding Younger Actress in 2011. In later years, she worked consistently on television, and in the films of her partner, Colin Minihan, including the 2014 film Extraterrestrial, the 2016 film It Stains the Sands Red and the 2018 film What Keeps You Alive, the latter of which Allen starred in and scored.

Education
She attended Etobicoke School of the Arts in Toronto, Ontario, Canada, and the Sheridan Institute for Technology and Advanced Learning in Oakville, Ontario, for their renowned Music Theatre – Performance Program.

Career
After a few minor roles in TV movies, Allen played the role of Marissa Chandler on All My Children from April 21, 2009 to December 21, 2010. For this role, she earned a Daytime Emmy Award in 2011 in the category Younger Actress in a Drama Series. She went on to appear in several TV series, with recurring roles in the Canadian drama Bomb Girls and the American science fiction western Defiance on the Syfy network.

In 2014, she played the lead role in the science fiction horror film Extraterrestrial, directed by Colin Minihan of The Vicious Brothers, with whom Allen started an ongoing personal and professional relationship.

In 2015, Allen starred in the psychological thriller Backgammon and contributed to the writing of the story for the independent comedy-drama film, Almost Anything.

In 2016, she teamed up with Minihan again for the unconventional zombie film It Stains the Sands Red, where Allen acted as executive producer and starred as a lone woman being chased by a single, relentless zombie throughout the desert.

In 2017, Allen starred in the science fiction drama Incontrol. She also had a co-starring role in the horror film Jigsaw, a sequel to the Saw film franchise.

In 2018, she appeared on the USA Network series Falling Water, replacing Brooke Bloom in the role of Sabine for the series' second season. She also played the role of Ella Riordan in the second season of NBC's "Taken". The same year she co-starred alongside her Jigsaw co-star Hannah Emily Anderson in the thriller What Keeps You Alive, which she also produced and scored. The film marks her third collaboration with Colin Minihan.

In 2019, she appeared in the horror film The Prodigy as Margaret St. James. The same year she appeared as Charlotte/Popclaw in the Amazon superhero black comedy television series, The Boys.

Personal life
In 2014, she started dating Canadian director Colin Minihan, whom she met on the set of Extraterrestrial, which he directed and she starred in.

Filmography

Film

Television

Awards and nominations

References

External links 

Canadian television actresses
1986 births
Living people
Daytime Emmy Award winners
Daytime Emmy Award for Outstanding Younger Actress in a Drama Series winners
Canadian soap opera actresses
Actresses from Toronto
Canadian child actresses
Canadian film actresses
20th-century Canadian actresses
21st-century Canadian actresses